The men's 100 metres competition at the 1998 Asian Games in Bangkok, Thailand was held on 13–14 December at the Thammasat Stadium.

Schedule
All times are Indochina Time (UTC+07:00)

Results

Heats
 Qualification: First 3 in each heat (Q) and the next 4 fastest (q) advance to the semifinals.

Heat 1 
 Wind: +2.8 m/s

Heat 2 
 Wind: +2.5 m/s

Heat 3 
 Wind: +2.4 m/s

Heat 4 
 Wind: +3.1 m/s

Semifinals
 Qualification: First 3 in each heat (Q) and the next 2 fastest (q) advance to the final.

Heat 1 
 Wind: +2.4 m/s

Heat 2 
 Wind: +1.9 m/s

Final 
 Wind: +1.6 m/s

References

Results (archived)
Results
Video of the competition

Men's 00100 metres
1998